Flashback is the third album by pianist Don Friedman which was recorded in 1963 and released on the Riverside label.

Reception

The AllMusic review by Scott Yanow stated: "The pianist shows that he was developing an original voice and was familiar with the avant-garde of the period... A fine, well-rounded set from the underrated pianist".

Track listing 
All compositions by Don Friedman, except as indicated
 "Alone Together" (Howard Dietz, Arthur Schwartz) – 4:38    
 "Ballade in C-Sharp Minor" – 6:25    
 "Wait 'Til You See Her" (Lorenz Hart, Richard Rodgers) – 4:18    
 "News Blues" – 4:59    
 "Ochre (Theme-Solo-Duet-Theme)" – 7:45    
 "How Deep Is the Ocean?" (Irving Berlin) – 5:49    
 "Flashback" – 6:56

Personnel 
 Don Friedman – piano
 Dick Kniss – bass
 Dick Berk – drums

References 

1963 albums
Don Friedman albums
Riverside Records albums